Harold Harvey may refer to:

Herk Harvey (Harold Arnold Harvey, 1924–1996), American film director, actor, and film producer
Doug Harvey (umpire) (Harold Douglas Harvey, born 1930), Major League Baseball umpire
Harold Harvey (artist) (1874–1941), Newlyn School painter
Harold Harvey (1895-1976) - WW1 veteran (Royal Field Artillery), Founder and Branch president of Wednesfield & Wood End Royal British Legion, Local Councillor for Wednesfield North, Owner of Harvey Electricals (Horseley Fields/Wednesfield), made the first radio in Wednesfield.

See also
Harry Harvey (disambiguation)